Saint-Marcel may refer to:

People
 , 9th bishop of Paris and namesake of a bell of Notre-Dame de Paris

Places

Canada
Saint-Marcel, Quebec, a municipality in Quebec located in the MRC de L'Islet in the Chaudière-Appalaches
Saint-Marcel-de-Richelieu, a municipality in southwestern Quebec, Canada in the Regional County Municipality of Les Maskoutains

France
Saint-Marcel, Ain, in the Ain  département
Saint-Marcel, Ardennes, in the Ardennes  département 
Saint-Marcel, Eure, in the Eure  département
Saint-Marcel, Indre, in the Indre  département 
Saint-Marcel, Meurthe-et-Moselle, in the Meurthe-et-Moselle  département
Saint-Marcel, Morbihan, in the Morbihan  département 
Saint-Marcel, Haute-Saône, in the Haute-Saône  département 
Saint-Marcel, Saône-et-Loire, in the Saône-et-Loire  département 
Saint-Marcel, Savoie, in the Savoie département
Saint-Marcel-Bel-Accueil, in the Isère  département 
Saint-Marcel-Campes, in the Tarn  département
Saint-Marcel-d'Ardèche, in the Ardèche  département 
Saint-Marcel-de-Careiret, in the Gard  département 
Saint-Marcel-de-Félines, in the Loire  département 
Saint-Marcel-du-Périgord, in the Dordogne  département 
Saint-Marcel-d'Urfé, in the Loire  département 
Saint-Marcel-en-Marcillat, in the Allier  département
Saint-Marcel-en-Murat, in the Allier  département 
Saint-Marcel-l'Éclairé, in the Rhône département
Saint-Marcel-lès-Annonay, in the Ardèche  département 
Saint-Marcel-lès-Sauzet, in the Drôme  département
Saint-Marcel-lès-Valence, in the Drôme  département 
Saint-Marcel-Paulel, in the Haute-Garonne  département 
Saint-Marcel-sur-Aude, in the Aude  département
Saint-Marcel (Paris Métro), a station of the Paris Métro, serving line 5.

Italy
Saint-Marcel, Aosta Valley, a municipality in the Aosta Valley region of north-western Italy

See also
Marcel (disambiguation)
Saint-Marcellin (disambiguation)